William Harper "Bill" Carter (born August 15, 1939) is an American businessman and former child actor. Using the stage name Harper Carter, he acted in several films as a child, notably the 1953 film Titanic, and appeared in adult roles in the late 1960s and early 1970s in film and television. In 1974, he moved to Westlake Village, California, and began working in real estate. In 1992 he became executive vice president of Sotheby's International Realty. Teamed with a fellow real estate agent, he has listed and sold more than one billion dollars in property.

Early life
William Harper Carter was born on August 15, 1939 in Los Angeles, California.

Film career

As a child, Carter acted in both films and commercials. He is best known for his role as Norman Sturgess, the son of a fictional couple aboard the RMS Titanic, in the 1953 film Titanic. He received good reviews for his performance; The New York Times called him "manly" and a book review complimented him for showing "just the right amount of naivete and exuberance".

Business career
Carter moved to Westlake Village, California, in 1974. He began working in real estate, and in 1992 joined Young Realtors (today called Sotheby's International Realty) as Executive Vice President. In 2006 Sotheby's named him the Top Producer for Ventura County. Teamed with fellow real estate agent Michelle Ouellette, he has listed and sold more than one billion dollars worth of property.

Filmography

References

External links
 

1939 births
Living people
American male film actors
American male television actors
American male child actors
20th-century American male actors
20th-century American businesspeople
American real estate businesspeople
21st-century American businesspeople
Businesspeople from California